Lone Willow Station was a former settlement in Merced County, California, located near present-day Los Banos.

Background
Lone Willow Station was a changing or swing station along the First Division route of the Butterfield Overland Mail, from 1858 to 1861.  Lone Willow Station was located on the west bank of Mud Slough, 18 miles east of the St. Louis Ranch Station and 13 miles northwest of Temple's Ranch Station.  This station consisted of a house for the hostler and a large barn for the relay horses and storage of their barley and hay.

References

Former settlements in Merced County, California
Butterfield Overland Mail in California
American frontier
1858 establishments in California
Stagecoach stations in California
Transportation buildings and structures in Merced County, California